George Richard Potter (1900 – 1981) was a British historian. From 1931 until 1965 he was Professor of Modern/Medieval History at the University of Sheffield. He also edited the first volume of The New Cambridge Modern History.

Works
Sir Thomas More (1478-1538) (London: Parsons, 1925).
Macaulay (London: Longmans, 1959).
Ulrich Zwingli (Historical Association, 1977).
(with Mark Greengrass), John Calvin (London: Palgrave Macmillan, 1983).

Notes

1900 births
1981 deaths
20th-century English  historians
Academics of the University of Sheffield